Plattenhausenriegel is a mountain of the Bavarian Forest; and Bohemian Forest, on the border between Germany and the Czech Republic.

Mountains of Bavaria
Mountains and hills of the Czech Republic
Bohemian Forest
Mountains of the Bavarian Forest